Whitman-Hanson Regional High School is a public high school located in Hanson, Massachusetts, United States. The school serves students in grades 9-12 from the towns of Whitman, Massachusetts and Hanson, Massachusetts. It is part of the Whitman-Hanson Regional School District. The schools colors are Black & Red and their mascot is the Panther.

Notable alumni
Lennie Baker (1946–2016) – singer and saxophone player for the group Sha Na Na
Nick Cafardo (1956–2019) – sportswriter for The Boston Globe
Sean Conover (born 1984) – former defensive end for the St. Louis Rams of the National Football League
Alex Karalexis (born 1977) – professional fighter and cast member on Season 1 of The Ultimate Fighter
Dana LeVangie (born 1969) – Former pitching coach for the Boston Red Sox
Joe List (born 1982) – stand-up comedian
James Lowder (born 1963) – best-selling dark fantasy and horror author and award-winning editor
Kristen Merlin (born 1984) – singer/songwriter/artist who was a contestant on The Voice
Kristie Mewis (born 1991) – professional soccer player and member of the United States women's national soccer team
Sam Mewis (born 1992) – professional soccer player and member of the United States women's national soccer team
Maura Murray (born 1982) – University of Massachusetts nursing student whose 2004 disappearance has been extensively explored in the media; set distance-running records at W-H and captained the cross-country team
Steve Smith (born 1954) – former drummer of the rock band Journey
Francis Spellman (1889–1967) – Cardinal Archbishop of New York (1939–1967)

Notable faculty

Carl Etelman (1900–1963), football back and coach of the high school team for 18 years

References

Educational institutions in the United States with year of establishment missing
Public high schools in Massachusetts
Schools in Plymouth County, Massachusetts